In the Wake of Separation is an album by the melodic death metal/thrash metal band Thine Eyes Bleed. First released in 2005 by The End Records, it was reissued a year later on enhanced CD including one bonus track.

Track listing

The song "Without Warning" appears on the skateboarding video game, Tony Hawk's Project 8.

Sources

2005 albums
Thine Eyes Bleed albums
The End Records albums